The Centre for European Policy (German: cep | Centrum für Europäische Politik ) (cep) is a German think tank whose task it is to evaluate the European Union's draft laws and legislation on the basis of ordoliberal free market criteria. Established in 2006 under the umbrella of the Stiftung Ordnungspolitik foundation, the cep is based in Freiburg. It is headed by Lüder Gerken, chairman of the executive board of the Stiftung Ordnungspolitik and the Friedrich-August-von-Hayek Foundation. Members of the board of trustees include Roman Herzog, Leszek Balcerowicz, Frits Bolkestein, Udo Di Fabio, Jürgen Stark, Holger Steltzner and Hans Tietmeyer.

Aims and objectives

cep works at the interface between science, politics and the public, and its aim is to consolidate, at EU level, policy which orients itself towards freedom and a free market economy while reducing regulation and red-tape to a minimum. As a centre of expertise, cep builds a bridge between EU politics and public awareness of EU politics in Germany. Through dialogue with academics, political decision-makers, the media and the public, cep develops strategies and concepts for the economic policy of the EU, monitors the EU's most current political projects in a constructive and independent manner, and creates transparency and awareness for European policy and its impact on Germany.

cep endeavours to inform the public about developments at EU level and the impact of EU policy, at the same time proposing concrete options for action. In addition, cep produces expert reports and analyses and advises politicians from all parties on EU economic policies. The academic foundation of the work are ordoliberal free market principles.

The foundation strives to maintain and further develop the ordoliberal tradition of the Freiburg School of Economics. This school of thought was founded by Walter Eucken, substantially refined by Friedrich August von Hayek and put into political practice by Ludwig Erhard, the Minister for Economic Affairs who helped ignite the economic miracle in post-war Germany.

The foundation drafts realizable policy options and advocates public discussion of ordoliberal concepts and ideas. To this end, it regularly organises lectures and panel discussion with well-known politicians, scientists and economists such as Angela Merkel, Günter Oettinger, Wolfgang Schäuble, Jürgen Stark and Jens Weidmann.

Controversy 
The cep published a study in early 2019 according to which Germany had benefited most from the common currency since its introduction. The researchers had compared the gross domestic product (GDP) of the euro states at various points in time with the GDP development of suitable non-euro countries, but without taking into account reforms in individual countries or the consequences of the European Central Bank's interest rate policy for the population. Experts therefore disputed the significance of the study, for example Clemens Fuest commented that economic growth in Germany and Italy was not due to the introduction of the euro. cep representatives rejected the criticism and referred to another study in which the "synthetic control method" had worked. Nevertheless, a new study argued that there were several flaws with the methodological application of the synthetic control method by the CEP study and provided new and corrected estimates where Germany is one of the countries who benefited the less from the common currency adoption, with an estimated loss of almost -6,000 euros per capita until 2007. Some of the pointed methodological flaws are: 1) incorporating developing countries with structurally higher growth rates in the control group for an advanced economy with structurally more modest growth rates (e.g. inclusion of Bahrain as control for Germany); 2) they do not assure that there are no differentiated shocks during the study period because they incorporate the period after the Great Recession in their analysis.

References

External links
 Link to cep | Centre for European Policy

European Union law
Freiburg School
Think tanks based in Germany